William Harold Roberts (born August 5, 1962) is a former American football offensive lineman who played thirteen seasons in the National Football League for the New York Giants, New England Patriots and New York Jets.

Biography 
Roberts was born in Miami, Florida, and attended Ohio State University. He was selected in the first round of the 1984 NFL Draft (27th overall) by the New York Giants. After appearing in 8 games at offensive tackle for the Giants in his rookie year, Roberts missed the entire 1985 season due to injury before establishing himself as a regular starter for the Giants in 1987. He moved to the guard position in 1989.

Roberts was selected to the Pro Bowl after the 1990 season, and played in 3 Super Bowls during his career, winning Super Bowl XXI and XXV with the New York Giants, and appearing in Super Bowl XXXI with the New England Patriots. Roberts retired after the 1997 season after a 13 year NFL career, having played in 195 games, with 154 as a starter.

References

1962 births
American football offensive guards
Living people
National Conference Pro Bowl players
New England Patriots players
New York Giants players
New York Jets players
Ohio State Buckeyes football players
Players of American football from Miami